
Year 283 BC was a year of the pre-Julian Roman calendar. At the time it was known as the Year of the Consulship of Dolabella and Maximus (or, less frequently, year 471 Ab urbe condita). The denomination 283 BC for this year has been used since the early medieval period, when the Anno Domini calendar era became the prevalent method in Europe for naming years.

Events 
 By place 
 Greece 
 Following Demetrius Poliorcetes' death in captivity as a prisoner of Seleucus, his son Antigonus assumes the title of King of Macedonia, though in name only, as King Lysimachus of Thrace is in control of Macedonia. Demetrius' remains are given to Antigonus and he is honoured with a grand funeral in Corinth. After this, Demetrius is interred in the town of Demetrias which he had founded.

 Roman Republic 
 Consuls: Publius Cornelius Dolabella and Gnaeus Domitius Calvinus Maximus.
 At the Battle of Lake Vadimo, Roman forces finally quell the allied Etruscans and Gauls. The Roman army is led by consul Publius Cornelius Dolabella. Rome is at last undisputed master of northern and central Italy.

 Egypt 
 The canal from the Nile River to the Red Sea, initially started but not completed by the Egyptian pharaoh Necho II and repaired by the Persian king Darius I, is again repaired and made operational by Ptolemy II.
 Ptolemy II enlarges the library at Alexandria and appoints the grammarian Zenodotus to collect and edit all the Greek poets.

China
 General Lian Po of the State of Zhou defeats an army of the State of Qi and captures the city of Yangqin.

Births

Deaths 
 Demetrius I Poliorcetes, King of Macedonia (b. 336 BC)

References